Dynamite Jack is a 1961 French-Italian comedy western film directed by Jean Bastia and starring Fernandel, Eleonora Vargas and Lucien Raimbourg. A Frenchman moves to Arizona in the Wild West era, only to find he is the exact image of the notorious local outlaw Dynamite Jack.

The film's sets were designed by the art director Robert Giordani.

Cast
 Fernandel as Dynamite Jack / Antoine Espérandieu
 Eleonora Vargas as Dolores
 Lucien Raimbourg as Sheriff Scotty
 Jess Hahn as Sergeant Bob
 Adrienne Corri as Pegeen O'Brien
 Georges Lycan as Louis le Borgne
 Claude d'Yd as Charlie McGregor
 Todd Martin as Henri
 Viviane Méry as Jeanne
 Marcelle Féry as  Loulou  
 Joe Warfield as Michel
 Colin Drake as Larry Schultz
 Carl Studer as Barman Fred

References

Bibliography 
 Walker, Janet. Westerns: Films through History. Routledge, 2013.

External links 
 

1961 films
French Western (genre) comedy films
Italian Western (genre) comedy films
French historical comedy films
Italian historical comedy films
1960s historical comedy films
1960s French-language films
Films directed by Jean Bastia
Films set in the 19th century
Films set in Arizona
1960s Western (genre) comedy films
1960s Italian films
1960s French films